Iolaus dianae is a butterfly in the family Lycaenidae. It is found in Zambia (the Copperbelt Province and the north-western part of the country).

The larvae feed on Phragmanthera polycrypta and Erianthemum species.

References

Butterflies described in 1983
Iolaus (butterfly)
Endemic fauna of Zambia
Butterflies of Africa